Rebeca Acevedo (23 January 1902 - 7 December 1987) was a Chilean professor and botanist. She was the first woman to head the botanical department of the Chilean National Museum of Natural History in 1947.

Biography
Acevedo was born in Retiro, Chile, in 1902. She obtained bachelor's degrees in biology and chemistry from the University of Chile in 1924. She continued working in the museum as an assistant to Maturana Francisco Fuentes, who was the head of the botanical department. Acevedo began to specialize in grasses, and continued working as a curator. She was put in charge of organizing the herbarium started by Carlos Muñoz Pizarro.

In 1947, she became the head of the Museum's botanical department, becoming the first woman to hold that position. She held this position until 1964. As curator of the National Herbarium, she established relationships with various researchers and botanical specialists around the world, such as Carl Skottsberg, Otto Solbrig, and Maevia Correa.

Legacy

References

20th-century Chilean botanists
1902 births
1987 deaths
Botanists with author abbreviations
People from Linares Province
University of Chile alumni
Chilean women botanists